Ode to a Tree is an outdoor 1977 sculpture by Le Roy (L. R.) Setziol, installed on the Oregon State University campus in Corvallis, Oregon, in the United States.

Description and history
L. R. Setziol's Ode to a Tree (1977) is an Alaskan yellow cedar sculpture installed in the Forest Science Laboratory's courtyard on Jefferson Street, on the Oregon State University campus. The abstract, "tree-like" form measures  x ,  x , . The bottom of one side of the sculpture features a bicycle parking rack. The installation includes a plaque with the inscription, .

The sculpture was surveyed and deemed "treatment needed" by the Smithsonian Institution's "Save Outdoor Sculpture!" program in April 1993. It is part of the Percent for Art Collection and administered by Oregon State University.

See also
 1977 in art

References

1977 establishments in Oregon
1977 sculptures
Abstract sculptures in Oregon
Oregon State University campus
Outdoor sculptures in Corvallis, Oregon
Wooden sculptures in Oregon